The Stephen William Brown Stone House near Montpelier, North Dakota, United States, is a stone house built by Stephen William Brown in 1889.  It was listed on the National Register of Historic Places in 2004.  The house includes a part built in 1889 with a cupola, and a lower addition from the 1980s.

References

Houses in Stutsman County, North Dakota
Houses completed in 1889
Houses on the National Register of Historic Places in North Dakota
National Register of Historic Places in Stutsman County, North Dakota
1889 establishments in North Dakota